Itaba is an administrative ward in Muhambwe Constituency in Kibondo District of Kigoma Region in Tanzania. 
In 2016 the Tanzania National Bureau of Statistics report there were 10,764 people in the ward, from 18,127 in 2012.

Villages / neighborhoods 
The ward has 3 villages and 30 hamlets.

 Buyezi
 Buyezi
 Kaharawe
 Karugendo
 Kayanze
 Kumsema
 Makimba
 Nyamikingo
 Ruhwiti
 Rukere
 Rushindwi
 Mukabuye
 Gwanumpu
 Kabuye
 Kageyo
 Kasagwe
 Kumwayi
 Mugalika
 Murugunga
 Murusange
 Nyakilenda
 Nyampfa
 Kigogo
 Bikera
 Kagomero
 Kamuna
 Kamunazi
 Ntakibaye
 Nyamafundi
 Nyamihwi
 Rubaba
 Rukome
 Serushikana

References

Kibondo District
Wards of Kigoma Region
Constituencies of Tanzania